Jennifer Elvgren is an American author and journalist, and has worked as a press secretary for the American politician Rob Bell. She is known for her books Josias, Hold the Book and The Whispering Town, the former of which won the 2006 Américas Award.

Awards
Distinguished Achievement Award for Excellence in Educational Publishing from the Association of Educational Publishers (2004, won)
Américas Award for Josias, Hold the Book (2006, won)

Bibliography

Books
Josias, Hold the Book (2006, illustrated by Nicole Tadgell)
The Whispering Town (2014, illustrated by Fabio Santomauro)

Magazine articles
Aislinn’s Caper (Illustrated by Sandy Rabinowitz, published in Highlights for Children, March 2003)
Well Done, York (Illustrated by Gavin Rowe, published in Ladybug, July 2005)
First Taste Sweet (Illustrated by Erica Pelton Villnave, published in Spider, March 2009)
Gatherin’ Up the Mountain (Illustrated by Claire Ewert, published in Spider, April 2010)
Nelly’s Sweet Song (Illustrated by Eric Freeberg, published in Spider, December 2011)

References

External links
 
 Interview with Kathryn Erskine
 Interview with WINA

Writers from Virginia
American children's writers
Living people
American women children's writers
21st-century American women writers
Regent University alumni
Westminster College (Pennsylvania) alumni
Year of birth missing (living people)